The 1957–58 season was Dinamo Zagreb's twelfth season in the Yugoslav First League. They finished 1st in the league, winning their third league title, with four points ahead of runners-up Partizan.

First League

Matches

Classification

See also
1957–58 Yugoslav First League

1957-58
Yugoslav football clubs 1957–58 season
1957-58